Angiotensin II receptor type 1 (AT1) is the best characterized angiotensin receptor. It is encoded in humans by the AGTR1 gene. AT1 has vasopressor effects and regulates aldosterone secretion. It is an important effector controlling blood pressure and volume in the cardiovascular system. Angiotensin II receptor blockers are drugs indicated for hypertension, diabetic nephropathy and congestive heart failure.

Function 

The AT1 receptor mediates the major cardiovascular effects of angiotensin II. Effects include vasoconstriction, aldosterone synthesis and secretion, increased vasopressin secretion, cardiac hypertrophy, augmentation of peripheral noradrenergic activity, vascular smooth muscle cells proliferation, decreased renal blood flow, renal renin inhibition, renal tubular sodium reuptake, modulation of central sympathetic nervous system activity, cardiac contractility, central osmocontrol and extracellular matrix formation. The main function of angiotensin II in the brain is to stimulate drinking behavior, an effect that is mediated by the AT1 receptor.

Mechanism 

The angiotensin receptor is activated by the vasoconstricting peptide angiotensin II. The activated receptor in turn couples to Gq/11 and thus activates phospholipase C and increases the cytosolic Ca2+ concentrations, which in turn triggers cellular responses such as stimulation of protein kinase C. Activated receptor also inhibits adenylate cyclase in hepatocytes and activates various tyrosine kinases.

Clinical significance 

Due to the hemodynamic pressure and volume effects mediated by AT1 receptors, AT1 receptor antagonists are widely prescribed drugs in the management of hypertension and stable heart failure.

Animal studies 

Elements of the renin-angiotensin system have been widely studied in a large variety of vertebrate animals including amphibians, reptiles, birds, and mammals.

AT1 receptor blockers have been shown to reduce fear memory recall in mice, but the reliability and relevance of this finding are to be determined.

Gene 

It was previously thought that a related gene, denoted as AGTR1B, existed; however, it is now believed that there is only one type 1 receptor gene in humans. At least four transcript variants have been described for this gene. Additional variants have been described but their full-length nature has not been determined. The entire coding sequence is contained in the terminal exon and is present in all transcript variants.

A huge number of polymorphisms is reported in the databases for AT1R which provide an avenue to explore these polymorphisms for their implications in protein structure, function and drug efficacy. Methods In the current study all the SNPs (10234) reported in NCBI were analyzed and SNPs which were important in protein structure and drug interactions were identified. Structures of these polymorphic forms were modeled and in silico drug interaction studies were carried out. Results Result of the interaction studies with polymorphism was in correlation with the reported case. Two SNP mutated structures of AT1R i.e. rs780860717 (G288T), rs868647200 (A182C) shows considerably less binding affinities in case of all angiotensin receptor blockers (ARBs).

Interactions 

Angiotensin II receptor type 1 has been shown to interact with Zinc finger and BTB domain-containing protein 16. The protein's mRNA has been reported to interact with Mir-132 microRNA as part of an RNA silencing mechanism that reduces receptor expression.

References

Further reading

External links 
 
 

G protein-coupled receptors